The 1981–82 DDR-Oberliga was the 33rd season of the DDR-Oberliga, the first tier of league football in East Germany.

The league was contested by fourteen teams. BFC Dynamo won the championship, the club's fourth of ten consecutive East German championships from 1978 to 1988.

Rüdiger Schnuphase of FC Carl Zeiss Jena was the league's top scorer with 19 goals, with Schnuphase also taking out the seasons East German Footballer of the year award.

On the strength of the 1981–82 title BFC Dynamo qualified for the 1982–83 European Cup where the club was knocked out in an East-West German encounter by Hamburger SV in the first round. Second-placed club Dynamo Dresden qualified for the 1982–83 European Cup Winners' Cup as the seasons FDGB-Pokal winners and lost to Boldklubben af 1893 in the first round. Third-placed 1. FC Lokomotive Leipzig qualified for the 1982–83 UEFA Cup where it was knocked out by Viking F.K. while fourth-placed FC Vorwärts Frankfurt lost to SV Werder Bremen and fifth-placed FC Carl Zeiss Jena was eliminated by Girondins de Bordeaux, all in the first round.

Table									
The 1981–82 season saw two newly promoted clubs, BSG Energie Cottbus and BSG Chemie Buna Schkopau.

Results

References

Sources

External links
 Das Deutsche Fussball Archiv  Historic German league tables

1981–82 in German football leagues
1981-82
1